Ty Clarke (born April 29, 1953) a former American football coach. He served as the head football coach for the Waynesburg University in Waynesburg, Pennsylvania for seven seasons, from 1987 to 1993, compiling a record of 28–39. He previously served as assistant coach at Muskingum University, Ohio Northern University, and Fairmont State University.

Head coaching record

References

1953 births
Living people
Fairmont State Fighting Falcons football coaches
Muskingum Fighting Muskies football coaches
Ohio Northern Polar Bears football coaches
Waynesburg Yellow Jackets football coaches
People from Tuscarawas County, Ohio